Ponta Do Ouro Airport  is an airport serving Ponta Do Ouro, Maputo Province, Mozambique.

See also
Transport in Mozambique

References

External links

Airports in Mozambique